All Over the Place is the debut studio album by American pop rock band the Bangles. Released in 1984 by Columbia Records, the sound is lively and shows more Bangles collaboration and fewer keyboard overdubs than were used later on their more commercially successful albums. Although the album was not a major commercial success – peaking at #80 on the Billboard 200 albums chart – and did not produce a hit, it sold respectably, mostly through steady airplay on college stations. It also gave them the chance to perform as an opening act for Cyndi Lauper and Huey Lewis and the News, and brought the group to the attention of Prince, who would write "Manic Monday", their first hit.

Two singles were released from this album: "Hero Takes a Fall", which peaked outside the UK Top 40, and "Going Down to Liverpool", written by Kimberley Rew of Katrina and the Waves, which won the Bangles the BPI Award, the British equivalent of the Grammy. The video for "Going Down to Liverpool" features Leonard Nimoy, who plays the part of the band's chauffeur.

The album was reissued in 2008 on the Wounded Bird Records label (WOU 9220) adding a bonus track: "Hero Takes a Fall" (Single Remix). In 2010, UK label Cherry Pop re-released the album with one bonus track, their cover of The Grass Roots "Where Were You When I Needed You", which was originally released as the b-side to "Hero Takes a Fall".

Commercial performance
The album spent 30 weeks on the U.S. Billboard album charts and reached its peak position of #80 in November 1984.

Critical reception 
Reviewing for The Village Voice in October 1984, Robert Christgau found the songs "thoroughly realized in both the writing and playing", with "familiar heart-stopping harmonies", and wrote in conclusion: "Though the style is as derivative and even retro as on EP, they don't seem to be dabbling any more. Maybe they project such confidence because they know exactly what they want to say: don't fuck me over."

Track listing

Notes
"James" was originally sung by Vicki Peterson but the lead vocals were sung by Hoffs by the time the album was recorded. The song's opening chords echo their arrangement of "The Rock and Roll Alternative Program Theme Song", recorded in 1982 for DJ George Gimarc's syndicated radio show (and later included on the band's Ladies and Gentlemen... The Bangles! retrospective of early material, released in 2014).

"Hero Takes a Fall" was given a subtle remix for its single release. It was backed by the non-album track "Where Were You When I Needed You", a cover of The Grass Roots tune by P.F. Sloan and Steve Barri. The single mix and B-side were both included on the Bangles' Greatest Hits compilation in 1990.

Personnel 
The Bangles
 Susanna Hoffs – rhythm guitar, lead and backing vocals
 Vicki Peterson – lead guitar, lead and backing vocals
 Debbi Peterson – drums, lead and backing vocals
 Michael Steele – bass guitar, backing vocals

Guest musician
 Jimmie Haskell – string arrangement on "More Than Meets the Eye"

Production
 Producer and Engineer – David Kahne
 Additional Engineering – Andrew Berliner
 Mixing – Joe Chiccarelli
 Mastered by Jack Skinner at Sterling Sound (New York, NY)
 Art Direction – Nancy Donald and Tony Lane
 Inner Sleeve Collage Design – Pete Lamson
 Collage Photography – Ed Colver, Mike Condello, Terry Dorn, Bruce Kalberg, Pete Lamson, Larry Rodriguez, Jeffrey Scales and Bob Seidemann

Charts

References

External links 
 

1984 debut albums
Columbia Records albums
The Bangles albums
Albums produced by David Kahne
New wave albums by American artists